Montmorency Football Club is an Australian rules football club in Montmorency, Victoria, currently competing in Division 1 in the Northern Football League.

History

The club was formed in 1924 by Harold Hodgson and was original based at Memorial park, Greensborough.  In 1925 the club relocated to its current home and joined the Diamond Valley Football League where it competed until 1931 before going into recess.  The Club was revived in 1936 and returned to the DVFL where it has remained ever since.  Montmorency won its first premiership in 1951 followed by a second premiership in 1954.  It was then another 22 years before the club won its third premiership in 1976.  After grand final defeats in 1977 and 1978 the club won its fourth and most recent A Grade premiership in 1979.  In 2007 the Diamond Valley Football League was renamed the Northern Football League.

References

External links

 Official club website
 Northern Football League website

Northern Football League (Australia) clubs
Australian rules football clubs established in 1924
1924 establishments in Australia
Sport in the City of Banyule
Australian rules football clubs in Melbourne